Leptolycinae is a subfamily of the Lycidae or "net-winged beetles" erected by Leng and Mutchler in 1922.  This subfamily includes notable genera such as Platerodrilus, which are sometimes called "trilobite beetles".

Tribes and genera
BioLib includes three extant tribes and the fossil tribe †Burmolycini Bocak, Light & Ellenberger, 2019.

Dexorini
Auth. Kleine, 1933
 Dexoris Waterhouse, 1878
 Elgodexoris Bocak & Bocakova, 1987
 Lampyrolycus Burgeon, 1937
 Lolodorfus Bocakova, 2014
 Mimolibnetis Pic, 1936

Duliticolini
Auth. Mjöberg, 1925
 Atamania (beetle) Kazantzev, 2004
 Autaphes Kazantzev, 2004
 Microeron Kazantzev, 2004
 Miniduliticola Kazantsev, 2003
 Platerodrilus Pic, 1921 (synonym Duliticola)
 Sinodulia Kazantsev, 2003

Leptolycini
Auth. Leng & Mutchler, 1922
 Alyculus Kazantsev, 1999
 Ceratoprion Gorham, 1884
 Cessator Kazantsev, 2009
 †Electropteron Kazantsev, 2012
 Flabellocaenia Pic, 1929
 Leptolycus Leng & Mutchler, 1922 - type genus

References

External links
 
 

Elateroidea genera
Beetles of Asia
Lycidae